Orvilliers is a commune in the Yvelines department in the Île-de-France region in north-central France.

Georges Pompidou, President of France from 1969 to his death in 1974, is buried in the local cemetery.

See also
Communes of the Yvelines department

References

Communes of Yvelines